P4A may refer to:
 
 Persona 4 Arena, a 2012 fighting video game
 Project for Awesome,  a community-driven charitable movement on YouTube
P4A-TV, TV station in Aruba, Dutch Antilles